Matthew Gerald Chance (born March 14, 1970) is a British journalist working for CNN as one of the network's Senior International Correspondents.

Career 
He is based in Moscow. Chance was one of the journalists held by forces of Colonel Gaddafi at the Rixos al Nasr hotel in Tripoli, Libya,  in August 2011. He reported by Twitter throughout the ordeal, and was live on CNN as the International Committee of the Red Cross finally evacuated the detainees.

Some of the other notable news stories he has covered include the 2001 war in Afghanistan, the invasion of Iraq by Coalition forces, the 2005 London bombings, the ongoing Middle East crisis, the Beslan school hostage crisis, Russia under President Vladimir Putin's leadership, the devastating 2005 Pakistan earthquake, the 2004 Indian Ocean earthquake, the 2008 South Ossetia war and the 2022 Russian invasion of Ukraine.

Chance was one of the few Moscow-based reporters to have secured an interview with Vladimir Putin, Russia's leader.

Since returning to London after the Libya War, Chance has reported from Italy on the fall of prime minister Silvio Berlusconi, and the release of Amanda Knox. He recently reported from Greece on the fall out of the country's debt crisis, and from the International Atomic Energy Agency in Vienna on Iran's controversial nuclear program.

Chance officially joined CNN in 2001. He replaced correspondent Steve Harrigan in Northern Afghanistan after Harrigan famously left CNN for Fox News Channel while on assignment.  Before joining CNN, Chance was a freelance journalist based in Asia.

References

External links
Matthew's profile on CNN.com
Interview with CNN Media Info

Living people
1970 births
People from Stourbridge
Alumni of the University of London
British television journalists
CNN people
People educated at Old Swinford Hospital